Edlanka or Yedlanka or mEdlanka  or Patha Edlanka is a village in Avanigadda Mandal in Krishna district, Andhra Pradesh, India. Its pincode is 521121.

Geography 
Edlalanka, located at 16°0'20"N and 80°54'7"E, is an island in the Krishna river delta and is separated from Diviseema by chinnarevu. The village has no embankments or levees to protect itself from floods.

2005 floods 
Villages were evacuated during the 2005 floods.

2009 floods and relief efforts 
The flood in river Krishna submerged the entire island except for a few pockets. Most of the villagers were evacuated  to Avanigadda, but in the process one of the boats overturned and two children lost their lives.

Demographics 
Edlanka Village Population Census (2005)

Households: 256
Total Population: 894
Male Population: 426
Female Population: 468
Kids Under 6 Yrs: 134
Boys under 6 Yrs: 50
Girls Under 6 Yrs: 84
Total Literates: 380
Total Illiterates: 514

Government 
The village does not have proper facilities for portable drinking water. The village does not conform to ARWSP norms.

Notable personalities 
 Padmashree Myneni Hariprasada Rao (Scientist)
 Sharwanand (Actor)

References 

Villages in Krishna district